Back Roads to Cold Mountain is a 2004 compilation album released by Smithsonian Folkways. The album was released in the wake of the award-winning soundtrack to the film Cold Mountain, and is composed of Appalachian folk music recordings compiled by musicologist  John Cohen in Appalachia.

The album was released in 2004, and the material was recorded between 1944 and 2002.  The recordings vary from traditional songs recorded by well-known artists, such as Wayfaring Stranger by Bill Monroe, to obscure field recordings.  There is also a Sacred Harp track.

Thom Jurek of Allmusic says the album is "one of true Otherness, where dislocation, quark strangeness, and untamed spirits gather in order to whisper, cry, moan, shout and laugh in a language that has not so much died as disappeared" and is "essential listening for anyone interested in authentic American roots music".

Liner notes by Charles Frazier, author of Cold Mountain, and Cohen are included as well.

Track listing

Notes and references

External links 
 Album page on Smithsonian Global Sound

Old-time music
Appalachian culture
Folk albums by American artists
2004 compilation albums
Folk compilation albums